Meserich Shul or Meseritz Shul, also known as Edes Israel Anshei Mesrich, Edath Lei'Isroel Ansche Meseritz or Adas Yisroel Anshe Mezeritz ("Community of Israel, People of Mezertiz"), is a 1910 Orthodox synagogue in the East Village of Manhattan, New York City. It was built by a congregation established in 1888 consisting of immigrants from  Międzyrzec Podlaski, a city in Biała Podlaska County, Lublin Voivodeship, Poland which was known as a center of Jewish learning. It was designed by Herman Horenburger in the Neo-Classical style, and is located at 415 East 6th Street between Avenue A and First Avenue.

Pesach (Paul) Ackerman served as Rabbi from 1969 until his death on June 14, 2013.

Jewish life in Międzyrzec 

Since the 16th century Międzyrzec was home to a large Jewish community. At the end of the 1930s in the reborn Polish Republic approximately 12,000 inhabitants, or 75% of its population, were Jewish.

Architecture
The congregation, founded in 1888, originally worshiped in a building on Clinton Street.  The building which now houses the synagogue was originally built in 1841 as a 2 1/2-story house for J. B. Murray.  Herman Horenburger designed the conversion into a synagogue in 1910.  It is similar in style to Congregation Kolbuszower Teitelbaum Cheva Banai at 622 East 5th Street, which was also built in 1910; both have sunburst pediments.

The synagogue is unusual in being a very small, urban congregation on a narrow lot that has an extremely beautiful Neo-Classical facade, and is the last operating "tenement synagogue" in the East Village. Andrew Berman of the Greenwich Village Society for Historic Preservation called it "an intact historic gem."

Architectural historian and New York University professor Gerald R. Wolfe describes the synagogue's "most attractive interior... The unusually narrow building has balconies which extend almost to the middle of the sanctuary, and through the intervening space, broad rays of light from two overhead skylights seem to focus on the Ark and on a large stained glass panel above it. The soft-yellow-colored panes of the two-story-high window are crowned by an enormous Mogen David [Star of David] of red glass which seems to dominate the entire room."

Andrew Dolkart, a Columbia University professor of historic preservation, believes that the building should be preserved, because cities should preserve "architecture that not only reflects the lives and history of the rich, but also the incredibly history of common people in New York."

Development controversy
The congregation is negotiating with Joshua Kushner, part of the family that owns the New York Observer newspaper. Kushner plans to tear down the present synagogue and build a six-story residential building, housing the synagogue in a modern space on the lowest two floors. According to historic preservationist Samuel D. Gruber, there is a feasible but more costly alternative which would preserve the synagogue building and construct apartments above it. A coalition of neighborhood groups including the Greenwich Village Society for Historic Preservation, the East Village Community Coalition, and Jewish groups have rallied to save the building and have asked the New York City Landmarks Preservation Commission to landmark the building.

The Kushners later pulled out of the development deal. In October 2012, the Landmarks Preservation Commission created the East Village/Lower East Side Historic District, which included in its boundaries the Meserich Synagogue.

The synagogue reopened in March 2017  with a ceiling put at balcony level above the beautifully restored sanctuary to separate it from the luxury apartments that were built.

References
Notes

External links

Synagogues in Manhattan
Orthodox synagogues in New York City
Lower East Side
Polish-Jewish culture in New York City
Synagogues completed in 1910
1910 establishments in New York City
Neoclassical architecture in New York City
Neoclassical synagogues